Le Fort III may refer to:
 Le Fort fracture of skull, type III
 Le Fort III osteotomy